Central Sudanic is a family of about sixty languages that have been included in the proposed Nilo-Saharan language family. Central Sudanic languages are spoken in the Central African Republic, Chad, South Sudan, Uganda, Congo (DRC), Nigeria and  Cameroon. They include the pygmy languages Efé and Asoa.

Blench (2011) suggests that Central Sudanic influenced the development of the noun-class system characteristic of the Atlantic–Congo languages.

Urheimat
The homeland of Proto-Central Sudanic is thought to be within the Bahr el Ghazal.

Classification
Half a dozen groups of Central Sudanic languages are generally accepted as valid. They are customarily divided into East and West branches.

Starostin (2016)
Starostin (2016) finds support for Eastern Central Sudanic (Lendu, Mangbetu, Lugbara, etc., concentrated in the northeast corner of DR Congo) but not for the western division, which would include Bongo–Bagirmi and Kresh scattered across Chad, the CAR, and South Sudan.

Starostin (2011) notes that the poorly attested language Mimi of Decorse is suggestive of Central Sudanic, though he provisionally treats it as an isolate. Boyeldieu (2010) states that the inclusion of Kresh has yet to be demonstrated, but Starostin (2016) finds good support, with Birri being its closest relative.

Bender (1992)
Lionel Bender (1992) classifies the Central Sudanic languages as follows, with Central Sudanic bifurcating into a Peripheral branch and a Central branch.

Central Sudanic
Peripheral
Moru–Madi
Moru (Miza, etc.)
Avukaya, Logo, Keliko
Madi (Lokai, etc.)
Mangbutu: Mamvu; Balese
Mangbetu: Meje, Asua, Aka, Lombi
Kresh: Kresh; Aja
Baadha ( Baledha, Lendu)
Central
Bagirmi-Sara
Barma (Bagirmi)
Sara-Mbay
Sara-Ngambay, Sara Kaba
Baka
Yulu-Binga
Fongoro
Shemya (Sinyar)
Bongoid
Bongo
Fer (Kara)
Modo, Jur Beli

Numerals
Comparison of numerals in individual languages:

See also
List of Proto-Central Sudanic reconstructions (Wiktionary)
Central Sudanic word lists (Wiktionary)

References

Sources 

 Blench, Roger. 2011. "Can Sino-Tibetan and Austroasiatic help us understand the evolution of Niger-Congo noun classes?", CALL 41, Leiden.
 Blench, Roger. Central Sudanic overview.
 Blench, Roger. 2018. Core and peripheral noun morphology in Central Sudanic languages. Proceedings of the 13th Nilo-Saharan Conference University of Addis Ababa, 6 May 2017
 Starostin, George. On Mimi, Journal of Language Relationship, v. 6, 2011, pp. 115–140.

External links

A map of Central Sudanic

 
Language families